Valley Hills Mall is a two-story regional shopping mall located in Hickory, North Carolina. It is currently managed by JLL. It is anchored by Belk, Dillard's, and J. C. Penney.

History 
The mall opened in 1978 as the second mall in Hickory, the first being Catawba Mall (now Catawba Furniture Mall). Its two anchors at the time were Belk and Sears. A 1988 expansion relocated J. C. Penney from Catawba Mall to Valley Hills Mall. A food court was located near Sears on the lower level. The mall was renovated in 1999 adding a fourth anchor, Dillard's, and a new, larger food court on the upper level. In May 2015 it was announced that a portion of the upper level of the mall would be reworked to allow for the opening of a new 20,000 square foot H&M store. On February 8, 2020, it was announced that Sears would be closing in April 2020.

References

External links 
 Valley Hills website

Shopping malls established in 1978
Shopping malls in North Carolina
Hickory, North Carolina
1978 establishments in North Carolina